The diving competition at the 1974 British Commonwealth Games in Christchurch, New Zealand counted a total number of four medal events: two events for both men and women. New Zealand, as host nation, did not win any medals in the diving event.

New Zealand's close neighbor Australia won gold medals on each of the two men's diving events, the 3-metre and 10-metre respectively by Don Wagstaff, who had also won both gold medals at the 1970 Commonwealth Games diving event. Australia collected 4 medals in total, while Canada took 6 in total, of which 2 were also gold.

Australia collected gold medals from each of the men's diving competitions, but would have to wait another twelve years until the 1986 Commonwealth Games before winning a gold medal in diving again.

Canada had a clean sweep of medals in the women's 3 metre platform event, the first time that had happened since the event's inception dating back to the inaugural 1930 British Empire Games. Canada also collected gold across both the 3 metre and 10 metre events from Cindy Shatto and Beverly Boys respectively. The event would be the last for Cindy Shatto, who chose to retire from competitive diving on the eve of the 1978 Commonwealth Games.

Medal table

Medalists

Results

Men

Women

References
Citations

Sources
 

1974
1974 in water sports
1974 British Commonwealth Games events